The Central Secretariat (often abbreviated Central Sectt on platforms and trains) is a Delhi Metro station in Delhi, on the Yellow Line. The Violet Line links it with Badarpur Border. The station provides a same-level interchange between the two lines. It was the southern terminus of the Yellow line from 2005 to September 2010, and the northern terminus of the Violet Line from 3 October 2010 to 26 June 2014.

Nearby landmarks include Krishi Bhavan, and the Parliament House and Secretariat Building.

Many DTC buses terminate outside the nearby Kendriya Terminal, including the 7 (Kewal Park), 185 (Nathul Pura), 190 (Burari), 260 (Harsh Vihar), 270 (Karawal Nagar), 271 (Jagat Pur Temple) and 581 (Deoli).

See also
List of Delhi Metro stations
Transport in Delhi

References

External links

 Delhi Metro Rail Corporation Ltd. (Official site) 
 Delhi Metro Annual Reports
 

Delhi Metro stations
Railway stations opened in 2005
Railway stations in New Delhi district
2005 establishments in Delhi